Aklan's 1st congressional district is one of the two congressional districts of the Philippines in the province of Aklan. It has been represented in the House of Representatives of the Philippines since 2019. The district consists of the provincial capital municipality of Kalibo and adjacent municipalities of Altavas, Balete, Banga, Batan, Libacao, Madalag, and New Washington. It is currently represented in the 18th Congress by Carlito S. Marquez of the Nationalist People's Coalition (NPC), who has represented the district since its creation.

Representation history

Election results

2022

2019

See also 
 Legislative districts of Aklan

References 

Congressional districts of the Philippines
Politics of Aklan
2018 establishments in the Philippines
Congressional districts of Western Visayas
Constituencies established in 2018